The Balaton Cup (Hungarian: Balaton Kupa) is an annual invitational cup competition for national women's football teams. It is held in Balatonfüred, Hungary on the shore of Lake Balaton, where it gets its name from. It is an invitational contested by 4 women's national teams from eastern Europe and it consists of 4 games: two semifinals, a third place match, and the final.

List of finals
The list of finals:

Participating nations

References

International women's association football invitational tournaments
Women's football friendly trophies
Women's football in Hungary
Recurring sporting events established in 2013